Yvon Jaspers (born 20 March 1973) is a Dutch television presenter and actress. She is known as presenter of Boer zoekt Vrouw, the Dutch version of Farmer Wants a Wife, and as presenter of Het Klokhuis.

As actress she is known for her role as Robin Theysse in the television series Rozengeur & Wodka Lime.

She was also the mole in the  2005 edition of the television show Wie is de Mol? Marc-Marie Huijbregts won that edition of the show by correctly identifying her as the mole.

References

External links 

 

1973 births
Living people
Dutch television presenters
20th-century Dutch actresses
21st-century Dutch actresses
Dutch children's writers
Dutch women television presenters
Dutch women children's writers